Bhagwati Prasad Shukla is an Indian politician and member of the Bharatiya Janata Party. Shukla was a member of the Uttar Pradesh Legislative Assembly from the Lucknow East constituency in Lucknow district.

References 

Politicians from Lucknow
Bharatiya Janata Party politicians from Uttar Pradesh
Members of the Uttar Pradesh Legislative Assembly
Living people
21st-century Indian politicians
Year of birth missing (living people)